Alexandre Rodrigues Soares (born 8 May 1990), commonly known as Xandão, is a Brazilian footballer who plays as a central defender for CSA.

Club career
He made his professional debut in the Segunda Liga for Desportivo das Aves on 15 March 2017 in a game against Olhanense.

Honours
'CSA
Campeonato Alagoano: 2018

'Bahia
Campeonato Baiano: 2019

References

External links
 
 
 

1990 births
Living people
Footballers from São Paulo (state)
Brazilian footballers
Association football defenders
Campeonato Brasileiro Série B players
Independente Futebol Clube players
Centro Sportivo Alagoano players
Esporte Clube Bahia players
Liga Portugal 2 players
C.D. Aves players
U.D. Oliveirense players
Brazilian expatriate footballers
Brazilian expatriate sportspeople in Portugal
Expatriate footballers in Portugal